Dream Factory may refer to:

Film, theatre and games
 The Dream Factory (film), a 1997 Chinese film directed by Feng Xiaogang
 The Dream Factory (2019 film) the English title of Traumfabrik a 2019 German film directed by Martin Schreier
 The Dream Factory, a Playbox Theatre Company theatre in Warwick, England
 DreamFactory, a Japanese video game company
 Dream Factory (distributor), an Indian film distribution company

Music
 Dream Factory (album), a 1986 unreleased double LP by Prince and The Revolution
Dream Factory, album by Neno Belan